Liu Cixin (pronounced ; born 23 June 1963) is a Chinese computer engineer and science fiction writer. He is a nine-time winner of China's Galaxy Award and has also received the 2015 Hugo Award for his novel The Three-Body Problem as well as the 2017 Locus Award for Death's End. He is also a winner of the Chinese Nebula Award. In English translations of his works, his name is given as Cixin Liu. He is a member of China Science Writers Association and the vice president of Shanxi Writers Association. He is also called "Da Liu" ("Big Liu").

Life and career 
Liu was born on 23 June 1963 in Beijing and raised in Yangquan, Shanxi, where his parents had been sent to work in the mines. Due to the violence of the Cultural Revolution he was sent to live in his ancestral home in Luoshan County, Henan. Liu graduated from the North China University of Water Conservancy and Electric Power in 1988. He then worked as a computer engineer at a power plant in Shanxi province.

Writing 
Liu's writing is influenced by fiction.  He cites English authors George Orwell and Arthur C. Clarke as important literary influences. He was labeled the first cyberpunk Chinese author after his novel, China 2185, was published in 1989. Liu's most famous work, The Three-Body Problem, was published in 2007 (it is the first novel in the Remembrance of Earth's Past trilogy). American author Ken Liu's 2014 translation (published by Tor Books) won the 2015 Hugo Award for Best Novel. Liu Cixin thus became the first author from Asia to win Best Novel. The German translation (which included some portions of the original text not included in the English translation) followed in 2016. Ken Liu also translated the third volume of The Three-Body Problem series, Death's End, in 2016. Death's End was a 2017 Hugo Award for Best Novel finalist and won a 2017 Locus Award for Best Science Fiction Novel.

Liu's three novels had been a sensation of Chinese science fiction literature within Chinese territory and internationally. In 2012, even the winner of the Nobel Prize of Literature, Mo Yan, acclaimed the remarkable originality of Liu Cixin. Liu's fiction focuses primarily on problems such as social inequality, scientific development and ecological limitations that impact humanity.

Adaptations
A cinematic adaptation of The Three-Body Problem has been filmed, but its release has been indefinitely postponed. In March 2018, Amazon was rumored to be negotiating for the rights to the project. However, YooZoo Pictures released a statement in response stating that it was the "sole owner of the rights for film and TV series adaptations." Although it "was originally scheduled to be released in 2017," the project "was postponed indefinitely due to the company's internal shuffling and the rumored 'bad quality' of the film's first cut." In June 2019, it was reported that work had begun on an animated adaptation, and in 2020, October Media announced another adaptation in the works.

The cinematic adaptation of his short story The Wandering Earth was released in China on February 5, 2019, which became the second highest-grossing film in the Chinese box office within 2 weeks.

The science-fiction comedy film Crazy Alien was adapted from his science fiction , which has grossed 2.2 billion at the box office, making it the fifteenth film in Chinese film history with a box office exceeding 2 billion.

US streaming platform Netflix announced in September 2020 that it had ordered an English-language series based on Liu's well-known trilogy The Three-Body Problem. Liu would serve as a consulting producer on the project. David Benioff and D.B. Weiss were named as writers and executive producers. Other members of the creative team included executive producer Rian Johnson, Ram Bergman, Bernadette Caulfield, Nena Rodrigue, Lin Qi, and Rosamund Pike.  The Netflix television adaptation started production in early November 2021, with a scheduled finish date in August 2022.

Chinese video platform Tencent Video released a series based on the books in January 2023. Chinese video sharing website Bilibili released a series exploring the science of Liu Cixin's science fiction in November 2022.

Films and TV works

Personal life 
Liu is married and has a daughter.

Political views
According to a June 2019 interview and profile article by The New Yorker, Liu avoids talking about politics. In the same article, Liu argued that democracy was not appropriate for modern China, and individual liberty and freedom of governance is "not what Chinese people care about", adding "If you were to loosen up the country a bit, the consequences would be terrifying." He expressed support for policies such as the one-child policy and the Xinjiang internment camps, saying "the government is helping their economy and trying to lift them out of poverty".

Liu's remarks in the New Yorker interview were questioned by five Republican U.S. senators in a letter to Netflix in September 2020. The letter asks whether Netflix was aware of Liu's remarks and demands a justification for proceeding with the adaptation of The Three-Body Problem. Netflix responded that Liu was not the creator of the show, and that Liu's comments "are not reflective of the views of Netflix or of the show's creators, nor are they part of the plot or themes of the show".

Bibliography

Novels
 China 2185 (中国2185) (1989)
 The Devil's Bricks (魔鬼积木) (2002)
 Supernova Era (超新星纪元) (2003)
 Ball Lightning (球状闪电) (2004)
 The Remembrance of Earth's Past (地球往事) trilogy:
 The Three-Body Problem (三体) (2006)
 The Dark Forest (黑暗森林) (2008)
 Death's End (死神永生) (2010)
 Of Ants and Dinosaurs (2010) renamed to The Cretaceous Past  (2021)

Works of short fiction
1999
 The Whale's song (鲸歌) (Science Fiction World)
 With Her Eyes (带上她的眼睛) (Science Fiction World)
 微观尽头 (Science Fiction World)
 宇宙坍缩 (Science Fiction World)

2000
 Inferno (地火) (Science Fiction World)
 The Wandering Earth (流浪地球) (Science Fiction World)

2001
 The Village Teacher (乡村教师) (Science Fiction World)
 Full Spectrum Barrage Jamming (全频带阻塞干扰) (Science Fiction World)
 The Micro-Age (微纪元) (Science Fiction World)
 混沌蝴蝶(科幻大王)

2002
 Devourer (吞食者) (Science Fiction World)
 Sea of Dreams (梦之海) (Science Fiction World)
 Sun of China (中国太阳) (Science Fiction World)
 The Angel Era (天使时代) (Science Fiction World)
 朝闻道 (Science Fiction World)
 西洋

2003
 The Glory and the Dream (光荣与梦想) (Science Fiction World)
 The Poetry Cloud (诗云) (Science Fiction World)
 The Longest Fall (地球大炮) (Science Fiction World)
 思想者 (Science Fiction World)
 詩雲 (Science Fiction World)

2004
 Of Ants and Dinosaurs (白垩纪往事)
 The Mirror (镜子) (Science Fiction World)
 Yuanyuan's Bubbles (圆圆的肥皂泡)

2005
 The Wages of Humanity (赡养人类) (Science Fiction World)
 Taking Care of God (赡养上帝) (Science Fiction World)
 欢乐颂 (九州幻想）

2006
 Mountain (山) (Science Fiction World)

2010
 Curse 5.0 (太原之恋) (九州幻想)
 2018年4月1日

2011
 烧火工 (guokr.com)

2014
 The Circle (圆) (Carbide Tipped Pens: Seventeen Tales of Hard Science Fiction)
 Time Migration (时间移民）

2016
 Weight of Memories (人生)

2018
 Fields of Gold (黄金原野) (Twelve Tomorrows)
 2018

2020
 To Hold Up The Sky

Collections 
2003
 爱因斯坦赤道

2004
 With her Eyes (带上她的眼睛）

2008
 The Wandering Earth (流浪地球）
 魔鬼积木·白垩纪往事

2014
 Time Immigrant (时间移民）
 2018

Essays 
2003
 文明的反向扩张 (Science Fiction World)
 远航！远航！ (Science Fiction World)

Awards

References

External links

 
 "Liu Cixin" (The Encyclopedia of Science Fiction; by Jonathan Clements)

1963 births
Living people
Chinese male novelists
Chinese male short story writers
Chinese science fiction writers
Chinese software engineers
Engineers from Beijing
Hugo Award-winning writers
North China University of Water Conservancy and Electric Power alumni
People's Republic of China novelists
People's Republic of China short story writers
Short story writers from Beijing